The 1914 Pennsylvania gubernatorial election occurred on November 3, 1914. Incumbent Republican  governor John K. Tener was not a candidate for re-election. Republican candidate Martin Grove Brumbaugh defeated Democratic candidate Vance C. McCormick to become Governor of Pennsylvania.

Results

References

1914
Gubernatorial
Pennsylvania
November 1914 events